Adenosine diphosphatase may refer to:
 Apyrase, an enzyme
 Nucleoside-diphosphatase, an enzyme